International is the second studio album by American recording artist Kevin Michael, released on March 16, 2011 in Japan by JVC.

Singles 
On March 2, 2011, Kevin Michael released the first single from the album titled "Spread the Love" featuring Emi Maria.

Commercial performance 
The album was released 5 days after the Tsunami in Japan which had a dramatic effect on album sales.  No official album sale statistics were released.

Track listing

References 

2011 albums
JVC Records albums